Smita Patil (17 October 1955 – 13 December 1986) was an Indian actress who worked in films, television series and plays. Regarded among the finest stage and film actresses of her times, she appeared in over 80 films in several languages, but mostly in Hindi and Marathi, in a career that spanned just over a decade. During her career, she received two National Film Awards and a Filmfare Award. She was the recipient of the Padma Shri, India's fourth-highest civilian honour in 1985. 

She made her film debut with Shyam Benegal's Charandas Chor (1975). She became one of the leading actresses of parallel cinema, a New Wave movement in India cinema, though she also appeared in several mainstream movies throughout her career. Her performances were highly acclaimed, and her most notable roles include Manthan (1977), Bhumika (1977), Jait Re Jait (1978), Aakrosh (1980), Chakra (1981), Namak Halaal (1982), Bazaar (1982), Umbartha (1982), Shakti (1982), Arth (1982), Ardh Satya (1983), Mandi (1983), Aaj Ki Awaaz (1984), Chidambaram (1985), Mirch Masala (1985), Amrit (1986) and Waaris (1988).

Apart from acting, Patil was an active feminist and a member of the Women's Centre in Mumbai. She was deeply committed to the advancement of women's issues and gave her endorsement to films which sought to explore the role of women in traditional Indian society, their sexuality, and the changes facing the middle-class woman in an urban milieu.

Patil was married to actor Raj Babbar. She died on 13 December 1986 at the age of 31 due to childbirth complications. Over ten of her films were released after her death. Her son Prateik Babbar is a film actor who made his debut in 2008.

Early life
Smita Patil was born in Pune to a Maharashtrian politician, Shivajirao Girdhar Patil and social worker mother Vidyatai Patil, from Shirpur town of Khandesh province of Maharashtra. As a child, she participated in dramas.

Patil studied literature at Bombay University and was a part of local theatre groups in Pune and spent much of her time at the campus of the Film and Television Institute of India (FTII), causing many to mistake her for an alumna. The family moved to Bombay (now Mumbai) in 1969, following her father's election as a cabinet minister.

Career
Smita Patil was a part of the radically political cinema of the 1970s, which included actresses such as Shabana Azmi. Her work includes films with parallel cinema directors like Shyam Benegal, Govind Nihalani, Satyajit Ray (Sadgati, 1981), G. Aravindan (Chidambaram, 1985) and Mrinal Sen as well as forays into the more commercial Hindi film industry cinema of Mumbai. In her films, Patil's character often represents an intelligent femininity that stands in relief against the conventional background of male-dominated cinema. Patil was a women's rights activist and became famous for her roles in films that portrayed women as capable and empowered.

Patil began her career in the early 1970s as a television newsreader on the newly transmitting Mumbai Doordarshan, the Indian government run broadcaster. Her first film role was in the FTII student film Teevra Madhyam by Arun Khopkar. Shyam Benegal then discovered her and cast her in his 1974 children's film, Charandas Chor. Her first major role was in his other film, Manthan, in which she played a Harijan woman who leads the revolt of the milk co-operative. Patil then won the National Film Award for Best Actress for her performance in the Hindi film Bhumika, just three years after her debut. The film, in which she portrays an actress leading a tumultuous life through sudden fame and stardom, brought her talent to the attention of the world. Her role in the 1982 film Arth is greatly appreciated for her portrayal as "the other woman" while acting opposite Shabhana Azmi.

Patil gradually moved to more commercial cinema. In an interview, she stated:

In time, commercial filmmakers like Raj Khosla, Ramesh Sippy and B.R. Chopra offered her roles, agreeing that she was "excellent". Her fans, too, grew with her new-found stardom. Patil's glamorous roles in her more commercial films, such as Shakti and Namak Halaal, showed that one can act in both, "serious" cinema and the "Hindi cinema" masala in the Hindi film industry. However, her sister Manya Patil Seth stated, "Smita was never comfortable in big-budget movies. She wept her heart out after performing the rain dance with Mr Bachchan in Namak Halaal; she felt she wasn't doing the right thing."

In 1984, she served as a jury member of the Montreal World Film Festival.

Patil acted with Raj Babbar in films such as Bheegi Palkein, Tajurba, Aaj Ki Awaaz, Awam and Hum Do Hamare Do and later fell in love with him.

Director C. V. Sridhar was the first one to pair her opposite Rajesh Khanna in Dil-E-Nadan in 1982. After the success of this film, Patil and Khanna were paired in successful films like Aakhir Kyon?, Anokha Rishta, Angaarey, Nazrana, Amrit. With the release of Aakhir Kyon? her popularity and her pairing with Khanna were at its peak. The songs "Dushman Na Kare Dost Ne Woh" and "Ek Andhera Lakh Sitare" from Aakhir Kyon? were chartbusters. Each of these films were different and dealt with various social issues. Their performances were critically acclaimed. In 1986, Amrit directed by Mohan Kumar became the fifth highest-grossing film of the year. Nazrana, co-starring Sridevi released posthumously and became a box office success and was among the top 10 films of 1987.

Her association with artistic cinema remained strong, however. Her arguably greatest (and unfortunately final) role came when Patil re-teamed with Ketan Mehta to play the feisty and fiery Sonbai in Mirch Masala which released after her death in 1987. Patil's performance as a spirited spice-factory worker who stands up against a lecherous petty official in this film was praised highly. On the centenary of Indian cinema in April 2013, Forbes included her performance in the film on its list, "25 Greatest Acting Performances of Indian Cinema". The Washington Post called her work "enigmatically feisty last performance".

During the making of Chakra, Smita Patil used to visit the slums in Bombay. It culminated in another National Award.

Personal life
Patil was an active feminist and was a member of the Women's Centre in Mumbai. She attempted to portray women's issues through her different films. She was also involved in charity work, donating the winnings of her first National Award to charity.

When Patil became romantically involved with actor Raj Babbar, she drew severe criticism from her fans and the media, clouding her personal life and throwing her into the eye of a media storm. Raj Babbar left his wife Nadira Babbar to marry Patil. Babbar and Patil first met on the sets of the 1982 film Bheegi Palkein.

Death and legacy
Smita died from childbirth complications (Puerperal sepsis) on 13 December 1986, age 31
. Nearly two decades later, notable film director Mrinal Sen alleged that Patil had died due to "gross medical negligence".

The Priyadarshni Academy started with the Smita Patil Memorial Award as a tribute to the veteran actress in 1986.

In 2011, Rediff.com listed her as the second-greatest Indian actress of all time, behind Nargis. According to Suresh Kohli from Deccan Herald, "Smita Patil was, perhaps, the most accomplished actress of Hindi cinema. Her oeuvre is outstanding, investing almost every portrayal with a powerhouse realistic performance."

In 2012, the Smita Patil International Film Festival Documentaries and Shorts was initiated in her honour.

On the occasion of 100 years of the Indian cinema, a postage stamp bearing her face was released by India Post to honour her on 3 May 2013.

Accolades

Civilian Award 
 1985 – Padma Shri – India's fourth highest civilian honour from the Government of India.

Film Awards

Filmography

References

External links

 
 
 Raw stock, rare appeal: Smita Patil at Rediff.com

1955 births
1986 deaths
Actresses from Pune
Deaths in childbirth
20th-century Indian actresses
Indian feminists
Indian film actresses
Indian television actresses
Indian stage actresses
Actresses in Marathi cinema
Marathi people
St. Xavier's College, Mumbai alumni
University of Mumbai alumni
Actresses in Hindi cinema
Actresses in Malayalam cinema
Best Actress National Film Award winners
Actresses in Gujarati cinema
People from Dhule district
Recipients of the Padma Shri in arts
Actresses in Kannada cinema
Actresses in Bengali cinema
Actresses in Punjabi cinema
Actresses in Telugu cinema
Filmfare Awards winners
People from Dhule
People from Maharashtra